Herman Louis Clement Donners (5 August 1888 – 14 May 1915) was a Belgian water polo player who competed in the 1908 Summer Olympics and in the 1912 Summer Olympics. He was part of the Belgian water polo team and won a silver and a bronze medal.

Personal life and death
Donners was born in Antwerp, Belgium, son of Jean Henri Edmond Donners and his wife Celene Helene Joseph (nee Verspreuwen).  He enlisted in the Belgian Army in 1914 and died in Calais, France, of wounds received in action during World War I in May 1915. He is buried in Antwerp.

See also
 List of Olympic medalists in water polo (men)
 List of Olympians killed in World War I

References

External links
 

1888 births
1915 deaths
Belgian male water polo players
Water polo players at the 1908 Summer Olympics
Water polo players at the 1912 Summer Olympics
Olympic water polo players of Belgium
Olympic silver medalists for Belgium
Olympic bronze medalists for Belgium
Olympic medalists in water polo
Belgian military personnel killed in World War I
Medalists at the 1912 Summer Olympics
Medalists at the 1908 Summer Olympics
Sportspeople from Antwerp
Belgian Army personnel of World War I
20th-century Belgian people